Nehemiah 1 is the first chapter of the Book of Nehemiah in the Old Testament of the Christian Bible, or the 11th chapter of the book of Ezra-Nehemiah in the Hebrew Bible, which treats the book of Ezra and the book of Nehemiah as one book. Jewish tradition states that Ezra is the author of Ezra-Nehemiah as well as the Book of Chronicles, but modern scholars generally accept that a compiler from the 5th century BCE (the so-called "Chronicler") is the final author of these books. This chapter describes Nehemiah's position in the Persian court and his piety.

Text

This chapter is divided into 11 verses. The original text of this chapter is in  Hebrew language.

Textual witnesses
Some early manuscripts containing the text of this chapter in Hebrew are of the Masoretic Text, which includes Codex Leningradensis (1008).

There is also a translation into Koine Greek known as the Septuagint, made in the last few centuries BCE. Extant ancient manuscripts of the Septuagint version include Codex Vaticanus (B; B; 4th century), Codex Sinaiticus (S; BHK: S; 4th century), and Codex Alexandrinus (A; A; 5th century).

The report (1:1–3)

This part opens the memoirs (chapter 1–8) of Nehemiah son of Hacaliah, who works in Persia as a court official but worries about the welfare of fellow Jews living in Jerusalem at the time. The first few verses of this chapter indicate the focus of the whole book of Nehemiah, starting by the introduction of the problem, that is, the "sad state of Jerusalem", followed by the solutions of this problem in the next chapters and the effects on the community in general.

Verse 1
The words of Nehemiah the son of Hachaliah.
And it came to pass in the month Chisleu, in the twentieth year, as I was in Shushan the palace,
"Chisleu (Kislev)":  While Ezra uses numbered months (the nomenclature of the Torah), Nehemiah uses 'Babylonian calendrical names'.
"The twentieth year": for the reign of Artaxerxes I corresponds to 445 BC, thirteen years after Ezra's arrival in Jerusalem.
"Shushan" or "Susa"
"Palace" (NKJV: “citadel"): or "fortified palace", also elsewhere in the book.

Verse 2
That Hanani, one of my brethren, came, he and certain men of Judah; and I asked them concerning the Jews that had escaped, which were left of the captivity, and concerning Jerusalem.
"Brethren": or "brothers", can be taken figuratively, but Williamson, noting , suggests to take this literally.

Verse 3
And they said to me, "The survivors who are left from the captivity in the province are there in great distress and reproach. The wall of Jerusalem is also broken down, and its gates are burned with fire."
The news of the state of Jerusalem troubled Nehemiah partly because of the 'shame' (reproach; herpa) of this circumstance ("on taunts of foreigners", ; ; ; ; ; ;), but perhaps because he is surprised that 'the walls are still down, even after the temple has been rebuilt'.

Nehemiah prays (1:4–11)
Nehemiah was passionate for the glory of God, so even while driven by empathy, before he formulated any plan, his first response was to pray to God. Eight times in his prayer, Nehemiah uses the term servant to refer himself, the Jewish people or Moses, also to begin and to close his prayer, showing his 'reverential submission' to God. Nehemiah's confession and petition reflects the whole Deuteronomic law, as he patterns his wordings after a condensed version of  about God's curses and blessings, trusting God's promise to gather his people when they return to God. This prayer consists of five portions:
 (1) the opening address, Nehemiah 1:5
 (2) the humble approach, a
 (3) the confession of sins, b, 
 (4) the appeal to the Divine Promise, 
 (5) the closing supplication for (a) the people, and (b) Nehemiah as their representative at the royal court, Nehemiah 1:11.

Verse 5
and said:
"I beseech You, O Lord God of heaven, the great and awesome God, who keeps covenant and mercy for those who love Him and keep His commandments." 

Verse 11
"O Lord, I implore You, let Your ear be attentive to the prayer of Your servant, and to the prayer of Your servants who delight to revere Your name. And let Your servant prosper this day, and grant him mercy in the sight of this man."
For I was the king's cupbearer.
"Cupbearer" (cf.): considered by many scholars to mean "one who tasted wine for poison" (Xenophon. Cyropaedia. 1.3.9), but in the LXX (oinochoos in Alexandrinus and others) causes the rise of a variant that suggests Nehemiah was a "eunuch" (eunouchos) found only in Vaticanus, Sinaiticus, and Venetus, but rejected by most scholars. However, the arguments against Nehemiah's physical mutilation (as 'eunuch') 'tend to be motivated by the myth of Persian beneficence' , and should not be dismissed lightly, as sociological studies indicate a possibility in tradition of Nehemiah as a eunuch.

See also
Artaxerxes I
Jerusalem
Related Bible parts:

Notes

References

Sources

Further reading
Blenkinsopp, Joseph, "Ezra-Nehemiah: A Commentary" (Eerdmans, 1988)
Blenkinsopp, Joseph, "Judaism, the first phase" (Eerdmans, 2009)
Coggins, R.J., "The Books of Ezra and Nehemiah" (Cambridge University Press, 1976)
Ecker, Ronald L., "Ezra and Nehemiah", Ecker's Biblical Web Pages, 2007.
Grabbe, L.L., "Ezra-Nehemiah" (Routledge, 1998)
Grabbe, L.L., "A history of the Jews and Judaism in the Second Temple Period, Volume 1" (T&T Clark, 2004)
Throntveit, Mark A. (1992) "Ezra-Nehemiah". John Knox Press

External links
 Jewish translations:
 Nechemiah - Nehemiah - Chapter 1 (Judaica Press) translation [with Rashi's commentary] at Chabad.org
 Christian translations:
 Online Bible at GospelHall.org (ESV, KJV, Darby, American Standard Version, Bible in Basic English)
 Book of Nehemiah Chapter 1. Bible Gateway

01